Robert Crane may refer to:
 Sir Robert Crane, 1st Baronet (1586–1643), English MP
 Bob Crane (1928–1978), American DJ and actor who played Hogan in the sitcom Hogan's Heroes
 Bob Crane (cricketer) (1942–2013), Australian cricketer
 Robert Bruce Crane (1857–1937), American painter
 Robert C. Crane (1920–1962), American newspaper publisher and politician from New Jersey
 Robert Dickson Crane (born 1929), advisor to Nixon and American short story author
 Robert K. Crane (1919–2010), American biochemist, discovered sodium-glucose cotransport
 Robert Q. Crane (1926–2018), Treasurer and Receiver-General of Massachusetts from 1965–1991
 Robbie Crane (born 1969), musician
 Robert Crane, a pseudonym of Bernard Glemser
 Robotman (Robert Crane), the first Robotman in the DC Universe